West Virginia Route 58 is an east–west state highway in Harrison County, West Virginia. The western terminus of the route is at West Virginia Route 20 outside Stonewood. The eastern terminus is at U.S. Route 50 in Bridgeport.

Major intersections

References

058
Transportation in Harrison County, West Virginia